The Mozambique long-fingered bat (Miniopterus mossambicus) is a species of bat within the family Miniopteridae. Its distribution is in Africa within countries such as Kenya, Namibia, Ethiopia, Zimbabwe, and other countries in East Africa at elevations of 420 to 1800 meters. It is nocturnal and uses uses caves and mines during the day as roosts. The holotype was collected in a mist net that was placed over a swimming pool at the Bamboo Inn, on the outskirts of Nampula, at an altitude of 420 meters. A paratype was also caught shortly afterwards in the same mist net settup. The species name mossambicus stands for the country the type series was collected in, Mozambique.

References 

Mammals described in 2013
Mammals of East Africa
Miniopteridae
Mammals of Mozambique